Sucre Province is a province in the eastern part of the Ayacucho Region in Peru.

Geography 
Other mountains are listed below:

Political division
The province is divided into eleven districts.
 Belén (Belén)
 Chalcos (Chalcos)
 Chilcayoc (Chilcayoc)
 Huacaña (Huacaña)
 Morcolla (Morcolla)
 Paico (Paico)
 Querobamba (Querobamba)
 San Pedro de Larcay (San Pedro de Larcay)
 San Salvador de Quije (San Salvador de Quije)
 Santiago de Paucaray (Santiago de Paucaray)
 Soras (Soras)

Ethnic groups 
The people in the province are mainly indigenous citizens of Quechua descent. Quechua is the language which the majority of the population (76.47%) learnt to speak in childhood, 23.21% of the residents started speaking using the Spanish language (2007 Peru Census).

Sources 

Provinces of the Ayacucho Region